Accessory is a German synthpop/electro-industrial group consisting of Dirk Steyer and Ivo Lottig. They have toured with other groups, including Hocico, And One, Terminal Choice.

The group began in 1994 when Dirk Steyer and Kay Resch formed a band under the name "Voices of Darkness", becoming "Accessory" in 1996. In 1997 they released a demo album, Electronic Controlled Mind on a small record label named SD-IMAGE. Ivo joined the group in October 1999 to play on keyboards. Shortly afterwards Kay left the band to pursue his own career, but returned in 2001 to do lighting and technical operations. They released their first official album, Jukka2147.de, in February 2001 after joining the label Out of Line. After the release of their second album, Titan, in 2003, Jukka Sandeck left the band to pursue an individual career.

Discography

Albums 
1997: Electronic Controlled Mind
2001: Jukka2147.de
2002: Live./Hammer
2003: Titan
2005: Forever & Beyond
2008: More Than Machinery
2011: Underbeat
2013: Resurrection
2019: Elektrik

EPs and Singles 
2001: Deadline
2002: ...And I Say "Go"
2002: I Say Go
2007: Holy Machine
2016: Ship of Fools

Compilations
2005: Awake The Machines Vol. 5 - "Never (short version)"
2008: Synthetic Reign Volume One - "Heartattack"

External links 
 Official Accessory website

Electro-industrial music groups
German synthpop groups
Musical groups established in 1995
1995 establishments in Germany
Metropolis Records artists